Giorgio Battistelli (born 25 April 1953) is an Italian composer of contemporary classical music. A native of Albano Laziale (province of Rome), he studied at the conservatory in L'Aquila and is a former student of Stockhausen and Kagel. Battistelli has written nearly 20 operas on subjects ranging from Diderot and d'Alembert's Encyclopaedia to Mary Shelley's Frankenstein. His opera CO2, based on Al Gore's An Inconvenient Truth, premiered at La Scala in 2015.

His opera Wake was premiered by the Birmingham Opera Company in March 2018 and is inspired by the story of Lazarus being brought back from the dead.

In 1994 he founded with some friends the improvisation group entitled Edgard Varèse and an instrumental ensemble named Beat '72. From 1985 to 1986 he was host of the Deutscher Akademischer Austauschdienst in Berlin. In 1990 he won the SIAE for an opera and in 1993 the Cervo Prize for contemporary music.

He was also artistic director of the Cantiere Internazionale d'Arte di Montepulciano, the Orchestra Regionale Toscana. He is currently director of the music section of the Venice Biennale.

In 2007 he was artistic director of the Jerwood Opera Writing Programme hosted by Aldeburgh Music.

His music is published by Ricordi.

Stage works

Honour 
 : Knight Grand Cross of the Order of Merit of the Italian Republic (27 december 2020)

References

1953 births
Living people
People from Albano Laziale
Italian classical composers
Italian male classical composers
Italian opera composers
Male opera composers
Academic staff of Milan Conservatory
20th-century Italian composers
20th-century classical composers
21st-century Italian musicians
21st-century classical composers
20th-century Italian male musicians
21st-century Italian male musicians
Knights Grand Cross of the Order of Merit of the Italian Republic